Sanguiyeh (also romanized as Sangū’īyeh; also known as Sangūyeh) is a village in Esfandaqeh Rural District, in the Central District of Jiroft County, Kerman Province, Iran. At the 2006 census, its population was 332, in 59 families.

References 

Populated places in Jiroft County